The Hetherington Prize has been awarded once a year since 1991 at Oxford University for the best doctoral thesis presentation in the Department of Materials. The first ever prize (1991) was awarded to Prof. Kwang-Leong Choy (D.Phil., DSc, FIMMM, FRSC, CSci), who went on to become the Director of the Institute for Materials Discovery at University College London and Fellow of the Royal Society of Canada.

The award is almost exclusively awarded to only one doctoral candidate per year, but in two years it was shared (in 2011 to Nike Dattani and Lewys Jones, and in 2015 to Nina Klein, Aaron Lau, and Joe O'Gorman).

List of notable winners of the Hetherington Prize

References

1991 establishments in England
Awards established in 1991
Awards and prizes of the University of Oxford
Materials science awards